Andrew Bain is a Scottish drummer and music educator. He is a senior lecturer at the Royal Birmingham Conservatoire, England.

References

External links

Scottish drummers
British male drummers
Living people
Musicians from Edinburgh
Alumni of the Guildhall School of Music and Drama
Manhattan School of Music alumni
Year of birth missing (living people)
Whirlwind Recordings artists